The Mermaid Lounge was a music club in New Orleans, Louisiana from 1993 to 2004. Local bands and out-of-town bands abounded, along with art shows and even an occasional flea market.  According to the New Orleans Times-Picayune, it "personified the funky eclecticism of New Orleans nightlife."

References

External links
  Club web site

Buildings and structures in New Orleans